NASA Astronaut Group 6 (the "XS-11", "Excess Eleven") was a group of eleven astronauts announced by NASA on August 11, 1967, the second group of scientist-astronauts.
Although Director of Flight Crew Operations Deke Slayton planned to hire 20 to 30 new scientist-astronauts, he did not expect any to fly because of a surplus of astronauts amid the looming dearth of post-Apollo program funding, exemplified by the concomitant devolution of the Apollo Applications Program into the Skylab Program. NASA found that only 11 of the 923 applicants were qualified, and hired all.

When the group reported to the Manned Spacecraft Center, Slayton told them that "We don't need you around here". He offered to accept their resignations, and promised ground assignments if they did not quit, but warned them to not fool themselves that they would soon fly in space. With self-deprecation, the men named themselves the "XS-11", or "Excess Eleven".

The group would be the last group selected by NASA for over a decade. The seven members who stayed with NASA after the Apollo Program ended went on to form the core of early Space Shuttle mission specialists, accomplishing a total of 15 flights between 1982 and 1996.

Background 
By 1966, NASA had formulated ambitious plans for the Apollo Applications Program (AAP) that would follow the Apollo program. These called for Apollo hardware to be used to create space stations in Earth and lunar orbit, the development of a Space Shuttle to service them, and further visits to the Moon, as many as six a year, leading to the establishment of permanent bases there. Plans called for no less than 45 crewed missions, utilizing 19 Saturn V and 26 Saturn IB rockets. There would be three orbital workshops, three orbital laboratories and four Apollo Telescope Mounts. The first AAP launch was expected to occur as early as April 1968 if the Moon landing went well. Each orbital laboratory was expected to be visited by two or three crews.

Slayton estimated that he would need 24 astronauts to fly the scheduled Apollo missions, and he had 31 on hand from the selections conducted in 1959, 1962, 1963 and 1965. This was barely sufficient for Apollo, but not enough to allow AAP missions to be flown at the same time. While Slayton and other NASA officials held private doubts about whether AAP would be approved and flown as planned, it was important that it would not be delayed or sidetracked by a shortage of astronauts. To carry out the program, nineteen pilot astronauts were selected in 1966. NASA also decided to augment the scientist astronauts selected in 1965 with a second intake.

Selection 
NASA issued a call for applications for scientist astronauts on September 26, 1966. The National Academy of Sciences (NAS) would conduct initial screening of candidates and forward their applications to NASA for selection. Accompanying the press release was a statement from Gene Shoemaker, the chairman of the NAS selection panel, which said:

Key selection criteria were the same as for the 1965 intake. Candidates had to:
 Be a United States citizen, or become one by March 15, 1967;
 Born on or after August 1, 1930;
  or less in height;
 With a doctorate in the natural sciences, medicine or engineering, or the equivalent; and
 Meet the physical requirement for pilots.

The announcement said that exceptions might be made for outstanding candidates, but height requirement was firm, an artifact of the size of the Apollo spacecraft.  Applicants had to provide supporting documentation in the form of academic transcripts, multiple references, a research bibliography and medical history. The deadline for applications was midnight, January 8, 1967. It was expected that between twenty and thirty astronauts would be selected.

By the deadline, 923 applications had been received. The NAS selection panel then went through them, and forwarded 69 on to NASA for consideration. For these candidates, background and security checks were conducted by the United States Civil Service Commission. They were then subjected to a week of physical and psychological tests and examinations at the USAF School of Aerospace Medicine at Brooks Air Force Base in San Antonio, Texas. This reduced the number of candidates to 21.

Interviews were conducted at the Manned Spacecraft Center near Houston, Texas, by Mercury Seven astronaut Deke Slayton, NASA's Director of Flight Crew Operations; the Chief of the Astronaut Office, Alan Shepard; Wilmot N. Hess, the NASA Director of Science and Applications; NASA physician Charles Berry; scientist astronaut Owen Garriott; Maxime Faget, the chief engineer of the Apollo Program; and Robert F. Thompson, the head of the Apollo Applications Program. Finally, they were taken to Ellington Air Force Base where they were given a test flight in a Northrop T-38 Talon to measure their degree of comfort with flying. The names of the eleven successful candidates were officially announced on August 4, 1967.

The group were demographically similar to previous astronaut groups: all were male and white, and all were married, seven with children. Two were born outside the United States. William E. Thornton and Karl Henize were over the age limit. They had written to Slayton during the selection process, and Slayton had informed them that the requirement would be waived for specially qualified individuals like themselves, a decision supported by the director of the Manned Spacecraft Center, Robert R. Gilruth, and Chris Kraft. The group contained three astronomers, two physicists, a chemist, a geophysicist, an electrical engineer, two physiologists and a physician/physicist.

Group members

Training 
While their selection process had been going on, NASA's budget for fiscal year 1968 had been cut. President Lyndon B. Johnson had proposed that NASA's budget be increased to $5.1 billion, of which $455 million was for the AAP, but Congress was not receptive. The Apollo 1 fire on January 27, 1967, had shaken its faith in NASA, and the cost of the Vietnam War was inexorably rising. NASA's appropriation was cut to $4.59 billion, with AAP receiving only $122 million. When the eleven new astronauts reported for duty on September 18, 1967, they were met by Shepard and Slayton.  In his welcome address to the newcomers, Slayton was blunt: 

The new astronaut group started calling themselves the Excess Eleven or XS-11. Assignments for the group were further delayed by the requirement to complete a full year of US Air Force Undergraduate Pilot Training to become qualified as jet pilots like the Group 4 scientists before them. But first there was five months of classroom training, 330 hours of instruction, mainly in the form of lectures and field trips. Many of these were delivered by the astronauts themselves, and there was even a guest lecture on exobiology by Carl Sagan. Normally, there were two lectures per day of two hours duration, with afternoons and every other Friday free to allow the new scientist astronauts to pursue personal projects.

The next phase of their training was flight training. Only Chapman had a private pilot's license, and of the rest only Musgrave had flown a plane before. None had flown jets. While the Excess Eleven had hoped that it would be possible for them to undergo it together, this was considered impractical, as the US Air Force's training facilities were stretched by the needs of the war in Vietnam. Instead they were sent to several different flight schools in Arizona, Oklahoma and Texas. Training commenced with six weeks in the piston engine Cessna T-41 Mescalero, then moved on to twenty in the subsonic jet Cessna T-37 Tweet, and finally to twenty-seven weeks in the Northrop T-38 Talon, the aircraft they would be flying for NASA. By this time four astronauts had been killed in accidents involving the T-38.

About a third of each flight school class flunked, were dropped because they developed a fear of flying, or quit, usually because they discovered that they did not like flying. The response of the scientist astronauts was mixed. Chapman found that he really enjoyed flying, especially in the T-38, and came second in his class; Musgrave and Allen topped theirs. O'Leary objected to the hazards of flight training, and after a month of flight training at Williams Air Force Base, including two solo flights, he decided that he did not like flying. On April 22 he informed a sympathetic Slayton that he had decided to resign from the Astronaut Corps. On August 23, NASA announced that Llewellyn had also tended his resignation after completing the first phase of flight training at Reese Air Force Base.

The final phase of their astronaut training involved scuba diving training with the Navy at the Naval Air Station Key West, desert survival training at Fairchild Air Force Base in Washington, jungle survival training at Albrook Air Force Base in Panama, and water survival training at Pensacola Naval Air Station in Florida.

Operations 
 
After completing their training, the XS-11 were divided between Apollo and AAP, with Allen, Chapman, England, Henize and Parker assigned to Apollo. A new role, the mission scientist, was created as an interface between the crew and the scientific community, as scientific aspects became more important with the later Apollo missions. The first so designated was England on Apollo 13, although owing to the abort of the mission, he was not called upon to perform the role. Starting with Apollo 14, the mission scientist was part of the support crew. Chapman served in the role on Apollo 14, Allen on Apollo 15, England on Apollo 16 and Parker on Apollo 17. In addition Henize and Parker also served on the Apollo 15 support crew, and Chapman on that of Apollo 16.

Holmquest, Lenoir, Musgrave and Thornton were assigned to Skylab, as AAP was renamed on February 17, 1970. Musgrave (who cultivated a notable passion for flying, eventually accumulating over 17,700 hours in 160 different types of civilian and military aircraft) and Lenoir were the first members of the group to secure potential flight assignments as backup Science Pilots in the Skylab Program. However, Skylab B was canceled and Skylab A abandoned in place after only three missions were flown.

Chapman and Holmquest left the program in July 1972 due to the paucity of flight opportunities. England transferred to the United States Geological Survey in 1972 before rejoining the Astronaut Corps for a second nine-year stint in 1979. Allen also returned to active duty with the Astronaut Office in 1978 after a stint as director of Legislative Affairs at NASA Headquarters in Washington, D.C., returning one day before the Thirty-Five New Guys arrived in order to secure his seniority. Holmquest also requested permission to return in October 1979, but his request was denied.   The requirement for scientists to be trained as jet pilots was lifted with the creation of the Mission Specialist position in the Space Shuttle program in 1978.

The seven remaining members of the Excess Eleven all went on to fly at least one Space Shuttle mission. Parker, Allen and Thornton flew two missions, and Musgrave ultimately flew six, the last being in 1996. He also carried out four extravehicular activities, totaling 26 hours and 19 minutes, and flew on all five Space Shuttles.

Notes

References 

 
 
 
 

NASA Astronaut Corps
Lists of astronauts